Gani Festival or Sallar Gani in Hausa Language, is an annual traditional festival celebrated by mainly four emirates in Northern Nigeria which include Borno emirate, Hadejia emirate, Daura Emirate, and Gumel emirate. This festival holds in the same way as Durbar festival of Eid al-Fitr and Eid al-Adha. The festival is held from the 12th of Rabi'al-Awwal every year in commemoration of the birth of Prophet Muhammad. Emir in company of his councils ride horses decorated with ornaments around the city. Members of the community also dress up in a special way on this day and make special food to share with family and friends. Hausa traditional music, encomium songs praising the Prophet, and dances are performed during the celebration. After the Durba, the king returns to the palace where he would be discussing with his cabinet on issues related to public affairs. The festival attracts the attention of tourists because it exhibits the culture of Hausas, Northern Nigeria and Africa.

References 

Hausa-language culture
Festivals in Nigeria
Festivals in Niger